"Blitzkrieg Bop" is a song by American punk rock band, Ramones, released in February 1976 as their debut single in the United States. It appeared as the opening track on the band's debut album, Ramones, released two months later.

The song, whose composition was credited to the band as a whole, was written by drummer Tommy Ramone (music and lyrics) and bassist Dee Dee Ramone (lyrics). The song is popular at some sporting events where its iconic chant of "Hey! Ho! Let's go!" is sometimes used as a rallying cry.

Blitzkrieg Bop was number 92 on the 2004 Rolling Stone list of The 500 Greatest Songs of All Time. In March 2005, Q magazine placed it at number 31 in its list of the 100 Greatest Guitar Tracks, and in 2008 Rolling Stone placed it number 18 of the top 100 Greatest Guitar Songs of All Time. In 2009, it was named the 25th greatest hard rock song of all time by VH1.

Origin and meaning
The song was mainly written by drummer Tommy Ramone, while bassist Dee Dee Ramone came up with the title (the song was originally called "Animal Hop"). The precise meaning and subject matter of the song is, unlike many of The Ramones' other early compositions, somewhat vague and obscure. Tommy Ramone said it was the story of the young audience attending a rock concert ("they're forming in a straight line", "are losing their minds", "are shouting in the back now"). Blitzkrieg is a reference to the German World War II tactic blitzkrieg, which means "lightning war" (fast attack). Dee Dee also changed one other line: the original third verse had the line "shouting in the back now", but Dee Dee changed it to "shoot 'em in the back now". The idea for a chant at the beginning of the song came from the 1975 Bay City Rollers hit song "Saturday Night", which begins with the chant "S-A-T-U-R-D-A-Y night"; Tommy Ramone wanted the Ramones to have a similarly catchy chant. The lyrics "Hey ho, let's go" were inspired by the line "High, low, tipsy toe" from the 1963 song "Walking the Dog" by Rufus Thomas, and specifically the Rolling Stones' cover of the song; the band had enjoyed mocking Mick Jagger's pronunciation of the line, which they thought sounded more like "hey ho". Tommy stated later that he "came up with the chant walking home from the grocery store carrying a bag of groceries."

Reception
Cash Box said the song had "a hard rock style, crudely fashioned, yet infectious in its energy" and said that "the tune is powerful, and the band's street punk stance is all part of the music."  Record World said it has "a wall of sound effect and [spouts] punk lyrics."

Bibliography

 Bessman, Jim (1993). Ramones: An American Band (New York: St. Martin's).

References

1976 debut singles
1976 songs
ABC Records singles
Ramones songs
Sire Records singles
Song recordings produced by Craig Leon
Songs about World War II
Songs written by Dee Dee Ramone
Songs written by Tommy Ramone